Mary Whitney Kelting is an American ethnographer and scholar of Jainism who is an Associate Professor of Religious Studies in  the Department of Philosophy and Religion at Northeastern University, College of Social Sciences and Humanities 

Professor Kelting’s research interests include the religions of South Asia, ritual theory, gender studies and cultural studies and she has published two books and many articles on these topics. She is a member of the editorial board of the Centre of Jaina Studies at the School of African and Oriental Studies, University of London. M. Whitney Kelting received her B.A from Colby College, and her MA and PhD in South Asian Language and Literature from the University of Wisconsin, Madison.

Bibliography and research papers

Bibliography
Following is a partial list of her books:

 Kelting, Mary Whitney. 1996. Hearing the voices of the Śrāvikā: ritual and song in Jain laywomen's belief and practice.

Research papers and conferences
 Tournaments of Honor: Jain Auctions, Gender, and Reputation,  History of Religions 48(4):284-308 May 2009 
  Candanbālā's Hair: Fasting, beauty, and the materialization of Jain wives Religion, 39:1, 1-10, DOI: 
 Good wives, family protectors: Writing Jain Laywomen's memorials

Current and imminent projects

References

External links
Building a Jain Maharashtra -  Virchand Gandhi memorial lecture by M. Whitney Kelting at Loyola Marymount University (2016).
Tracking Changes in Jain Devotional Singing

Living people
Scholars of Jainism
American women writers
Colby College alumni
University of Wisconsin–Madison College of Letters and Science alumni
Northeastern University faculty
Year of birth missing (living people)